Leslie T. Chang is a Chinese-American journalist and the author of Factory Girls: From Village to City in a Changing China (2008).  A former China correspondent for the Wall Street Journal, she has been described as "an insightful interpreter of a society in flux."

Early life 
Chang was born in New York, United States. Chang's father was Leroy L. Chang, a physicist, researcher, professor, and Dean of Science at Hong Kong University of Science and Technology. Chang was raised outside of New York City, New York.

Education 
In 1991, Chang earned a degree in American history and literature from Harvard University.

Career 
In 2004, as a reporter for The Wall Street Journal, Chang visited Dongguan, Guangdong province, China.

Factory Girls
In response to the negative press surrounding working conditions in Chinese factories, Chang decided to explore the subject from the perspective of the workers. In 2004 she traveled to the South Central China factory city of Dongguan to document the lives of Wu Chunming and Lu Qingmin, two migrant workers who were born to poor farming families. The book follows their lives over three years and also includes the author's own family history of migration within China and to the West.

Factory Girls was named one of the New York Times 100 Notable Books of 2008 and also received the 2009 PEN USA Literary Award for Research Nonfiction and the Asian American Literary Award for nonfiction. According to Chang's website, translations are forthcoming in French, Italian, Spanish, Dutch, Finnish, Portuguese, Chinese, Japanese, Thai, and Arabic.

Personal life 
Chang's husband is Peter Hessler, an author.

Awards and honors
2009 PEN USA Literary Award for Research Nonfiction (Factory Girls)
2008 New York Times Notable Book (Factory Girls)

See also 
 List of Harvard University people#Journalism

References

External links
 
 Holding Up the Sky, Sunday Book Review, The New York Times
 The China Beat: Factory Girls
 Factory Girls reviews
 Leslie T. Chang official website
 
 Booknotes interview with Chang on Beyond the Narrow Gate, September 12, 1999.
 
 National Geographic May 2008 Issue Wholly Devoted to China

Living people
Year of birth missing (living people)
Harvard University alumni
American writers of Chinese descent
American journalists of Chinese descent
The Wall Street Journal people
American women journalists of Asian descent
21st-century American women